ISO 3166-2:SO is the entry for Somalia in ISO 3166-2, part of the ISO 3166 standard published by the International Organization for Standardization (ISO), which defines codes for the names of the principal subdivisions (e.g., provinces or states) of all countries coded in ISO 3166-1.

Currently for Somalia, ISO 3166-2 codes are defined for 18 regions.

Each code consists of two parts, separated by a hyphen. The second part is two letters.

The autonomous region of Somaliland (a sovereign State which claims independence but is not recognized by any nation) the region spans 6 major regions and doesn't have any separate code.

Current codes
Subdivision names are listed as in the ISO 3166-2 standard published by the ISO 3166 Maintenance Agency (ISO 3166/MA).

Click on the button in the header to sort each column.

See also
 Subdivisions of Somalia
 FIPS region codes of Somalia

External links
 ISO Online Browsing Platform: SO
 Regions of Somalia, Statoids.com

2:SO
ISO 3166-2
Somalia geography-related lists